Nazrana is a 1987 Indian drama film, directed by Ravi Tandon in a screenplay written by Vijay Kaul. The film stars Rajesh Khanna, Smita Patil and Sridevi in the lead roles. Shafi Inamdar, Priti Sapru and Dalip Tahil are featured in supporting roles. The film's original score was composed by Laxmikant Pyarelal. The film was released a month following Patil's death and was dedicated in her memory. The film received critical acclaim and was a box office success, grossing 3 crore.

Plot
The story starts with a courtroom scene where Rajat Verma (Rajesh Khanna) is being accused of the murder of Sheetal Puri (Priti Sapru). At this point, Mukta (Smita Patil) steps into the witness box and recollects the whole story.

Rajat was a music director. He meets dancer Mukta and falls in love. However, Mukta's father doesn't allow Mukta to marry Rajat and hence Mukta runs away to do a registry marriage with Rajat. Rajat and Mukta get married and everything is hunky-dory for some days. However, it is learnt that Mukta cannot bear kids.

Later Rajat becomes the head of music composing for a leading advertising firm. Sheetal is an upcoming model who will stop at nothing to reach the top and stay there. She even makes advances on Rajat, who rejects all of them. She learns dance from Mukta and music is created by Rajat for her to dance professionally in advertisements.

Meanwhile, Mukta and Rajat have a housemaid at their house. It is revealed that around 7 years ago, when the housemaid's husband tried to sell off his 10-year-old daughter Tulsi, Mukta intervened and decided to take care of the education expenses of Tulsi. When Tulsi returns to village, she paints herself as dark skinned so that she can stay in slums. However, Tulsi is actually beautiful. Tulsi, then decides to work as housemaid in the house of Rajat and Mukta.

While Rajat decides to not work with Sheetal as she spoke ill of his wife, even his housemaid coincidentally falls ill and Tulsi becomes a housemaid at Rajat's house temporarily. Rajat terminates Sheetal's contract with his firm. This causes huge financial losses to Shailendra Inamdaarp's firm, as Sheetal has become famous and almost no model is ready to step into her shoes.

However, one day, while Mukta is away, Rajat realises that to do Shafi Inamdar's show, he can replace Sheetal with Tulsi. Soon a portfolio of Tulsi is prepared.

While returning from the launch party of Tulsi, Rajat's car breaks down due to heavy rains and Tulsi decides to change her dress in the house of Rajat. However, seeing Tulsi in dress of his wife, he gets excited and sleeps with her. Next day Mukta returns to house and dismisses Tulsi as she understands what had transpired between Rajat and Tulsi the earlier day.

Sheetal, however, is unhappy as her need for power and attention is increasing. She starts spreading false rumours about Rajat and herself having an affair so that she can destroy Mukta's marriage. While Rajat is seen heavily drunk in the road, Sheetal brings him to her home and calls up Mukta to inform her that Rajat stayed with her the whole night.

Mukta is disturbed by the rumours. Rajat tries to assuage her and assures that there is no such thing going on between him and Sheetal. However, with each day, Mukta's suspicion and bitterness towards Rajat grows stronger. Finally, Rajat too is unable to take this and calls it quits. Rajat says he is ready to sign divorce-related papers.

After that, Rajat goes downhill. He starts drinking excessively and causes headlines for all the wrong reasons.

Meanwhile, Mukta discovers that Tulsi is pregnant with Rajat's child and the housemaid dies when the slum dwellers make fun of Tulsi for being pregnant without marriage. Mukta tries to reconcile, but Sheetal coldly informs her that she has lost Rajat to Sheetal for good, no matter what the case appears to be and Sheetal lies that she needs Mukta's signature so that Rajat can divorce Mukta.

Mukta becomes a recluse when Rajat leaves her and when she learns of Rajat's intention to divorce her. Tulsi decides to bear the child and she decides to give the child to Mukta and spreads the lie that it is Mukta's child.

When Sheetal learns of Mukta's pregnancy, she sees to it that Rajat never learns about it.

All this is witnessed by Tulsi (Sridevi), Rajat's housemaid. She is helpless even as Rajat stumbles deeper into the mess. Little does she know that she is going to be the turning point of rest of the story.

Rajat, in utter desperation, decides to launch Tulsi as a new model. Tulsi has no other option but to go along with his decision. Rajat transforms Tulsi and sure enough, Tulsi starts gaining market. Sheetal is naturally enraged by this unexpected roadblock.

The rest of the story is all about how the entry of Tulsi affects the relation of Mukta and Rajat further. Will Tulsi fall in love with Rajat? Will Tulsi marry Rajat? Will Mukta ever come to know that Rajat was innocent? Will Sheetal play spoilsport to Mukta's life even more? Will Mukta and Rajat ever be able to reconcile? What landed all of them in court?

Cast

Rajesh Khanna as Rajat Verma
Smita Patil as Mrs. Mukta Verma
Sridevi as Tulsi
Shafi Inamdar as Shafi
Priti Sapru as Sheetal Puri
Jayshree Gadkar as Parvati
Dalip Tahil as Banke
 Om Shivpuri as Lawyer
 Iftekhar  as Lawyer
 Pinchoo Kapoor
 Abhi Bhattacharya
 Geeta Siddharth
Chandrashekhar Dubey as Parvati's Husband
Savita Bajaj as  Sansa Dai

Soundtrack

References

External links
 

1987 films
Indian romantic drama films
1980s Hindi-language films
1987 romantic drama films
Films scored by Laxmikant–Pyarelal
Films directed by Ravi Tandon